"Little Girls" is a song by American new wave group Oingo Boingo and the opening track of their debut album Only a Lad.

Background
"Little Girls" was written by Danny Elfman after reading an article in a newspaper. The song was written as a satire and has a strong punk influence, plus horn arrangements. When asked about the song's darkly humorous lyrics in 2010, Elfman replied that:

Elfman would reiterate this view in 2014, claiming that the song was an "in-your-face facetious jab." Elfman has occasionally offered other explanations; in a 1985 concert he jokingly suggested that the song was about how his girlfriend was so "very, very little" that "she fits in the palm of [his] hand."

"Little Girls" was described by Creative Loafing Tampa as one of the standout tracks of Only a Lad.

The music video, directed by his brother Richard Elfman, depicts Elfman in an empty house dancing with girls and people with dwarfism, followed by on-lookers (portrayed by other members of Oingo Boingo) staring vacantly as he walks down a street with an apparent underage girl. The video features set pieces strongly reminiscent of German Expressionist filmmaking, such as that seen in The Cabinet of Dr. Caligari. It was originally banned in Canada and was named "the creepiest music video of all time" by The Independent.

References

Oingo Boingo songs
1981 songs
Music video controversies
Satirical songs
Songs written by Danny Elfman